Gregg Amore (born October 28, 1966) is an American politician currently serving as the Secretary of State of Rhode Island.

Education 
Amore earned his bachelor's degree in history from Providence College and his Master of Public Policy from New England College.

State House of Representatives 
\When District 65 Republican Representative John Savage retired and left the seat open in 2012, Amore ran in the three-way Democratic Primary, winning by 61 votes with 845 votes (40.4%). He won the November 6, 2012 General election with 3,898 votes (67.4%) against Joseph Botelho.

Amore has served as Deputy Majority Leader and holds a seat on the influential House Finance Committee, chairing its Education Subcommittee. He currently serves as the Chairman of the House Small Business Committee.

Secretary of State
In September 2021, Amore declared his candidacy for Secretary of State of Rhode Island, as Nellie Gorbea was term limited. Amore defeated Pat Cortellessa

References

External links 
Official page at the Rhode Island General Assembly
Gregg Amore for Secretary of State campaign website
Archived state representative campaign site

Gregg Amore at Ballotpedia
Gregg Amore at the National Institute on Money in State Politics

1966 births
21st-century American politicians
Living people
Democratic Party members of the Rhode Island House of Representatives
New England College alumni
People from East Providence, Rhode Island
Place of birth missing (living people)
Politicians in East Providence, Rhode Island
Providence College alumni
Secretaries of State of Rhode Island